Triplophysa sewerzowi, or Severtsov's loach, is a species of ray-finned fish in the genus Triplophysa.

References

sewerzowi
Fish described in 1938